On Fire! is the tenth studio album of the Christian rock band, Petra. It was released in 1988 by StarSong.

The songs of this album are in the Hard rock category. The lyrics continue the theme of spiritual warfare featured in their previous efforts, with metaphors making reference to military subtexts ("Mine Field", "Defector"). The band also tackles issues such as homelessness ("Homeless Few") and other personal and social issues.

This is the first album to feature Ronny Cates on bass who would remain with the band until 1995. With his addition to the line-up, the band started their more stable period in terms of line-up. Schlitt, Hartman, Cates, Lawry and Weaver would remain together for seven years and six albums.

Track listing
All songs written by Bob Hartman, except where noted.
 "All Fired Up" – 4:30
 "Hit You Where You Live" (music by Billy Smiley and Dino Elefante) – 4:20
 "Mine Field" – 4:28
 "First Love" (music by John Elefante) – 4:10
 "Defector" – 4:30
 "Counsel of the Holy" (words & music by John Lawry & Danny Kingen) – 3:37
 "Somebody's Gonna Praise His Name" – 4:02
 "Open Book" – 4:28
 "Stand in the Gap" – 4:10
 "Homeless Few" (music by John Lawry) – 4:33

Awards
 Nominated for a Grammy Award for Best Gospel Performance in 1989.

Personnel 
Petra
 John Schlitt – lead vocals, backing vocals
 Bob Hartman – lead guitars, arrangements
 John Lawry – keyboards, computer programming, backing vocals, arrangements
 Ronny Cates – bass guitar
 Louie Weaver – drums

Additional musicians
 John Andrew Schreiner – keyboards, programming
 Tim Heintz – programming
 Bob Carlisle – backing vocals
 John Elefante – backing vocals, arrangements
 Riki Michele – backing vocals on "Homeless Few"
 Dino Elefante – arrangements

Production
 John Elefante – producer, engineer at Pakaderm Studio, Los Alamitos, California and Woodland Sound Studio, Nashville, Tennessee
 Dino Elefante – producer, engineer
 Mike Mireau – engineer
 Mannie Parker – assistant engineer
 Greg Parker – assistant engineer
 Jeff Simmons – assistant engineer
 Steve Hall – mastering at Future Disc, Hollywood, California
 Dave Rogers – art direction, design
 Ken Westphal – illustration

References

1988 albums
Petra (band) albums